Named for a mythical medieval French sword, the Durandal is an anti-runway penetration bomb developed by the French company Matra (now MBDA), designed to destroy airport runways and exported to several countries. A simple crater in a runway could be just filled in, so the Durandal uses two explosions to displace the concrete slabs of a runway, thus making the runway much more difficult to repair.

Overview

Designed to be dropped from low altitudes, the bomb's fall is slowed by a parachute. When the bomb has reached a 40° angle due to the parachute's drag, it fires a rocket booster that accelerates it into the runway surface. The  primary charge explodes after the weapon has penetrated the concrete and drives the secondary charge even deeper. The  secondary charge then explodes after a one-second delay. Later production weapons have a programmable fuse that can delay the secondary detonation up to several hours.

Service history
There is a persistent story that the first use of the current Matra Durandal was by Israeli Mirages during the Six-Day War. This is inaccurate, as this war took place ten years before the Durandal was first available on the arms market. Rather, the prototype French/Israeli anti-runway weapon program which actually cratered Egyptian runways in 1967 is related, but distinct from the Durandal. The Israeli weapon used rockets rather than parachutes to brake over the target. The Matra development branch was in development from 1971 on and would form the basis for the Durandal which uses parachute braking.

The Durandal was adopted by the US in a slightly modified form (with a steeper impact angle and a higher 630 knot deployment speed) as the BLU-107/B in the 1980s, and carried by F-111 and F-15E strike aircraft.

In addition, the Durandal is in service with Argentina, Turkey, and at least 14 other nations. The Durandal is not currently in the weapon inventory of the French Armée de l'Air

It was used by the USAF in Desert Storm, delivered by F-111E's of the 20th Fighter Wing operating out of Turkey. 20th Wing flight commander Captain George Kelman said "there is nothing better at destroying a runway than a Durandal."

It has been reported that China has developed its own anti-runway bombs, the Type 200A, using Durandals as models. In the 1980s, China purchased a number of Durandals from France.

Users

See also
 BAPI – A Brazilian anti-runway weapon
DRDO SAAW – An Indian precision-guided anti-airfield weapon
 JP233 – A British anti-runway weapon
 BAP 100 – A smaller French anti-runway weapon adopted by the French Air Force

References

External links
 BLU-107 page on GlobalSecurity
 MBDA (Matra) BLU-107/B Durandal - Designation Systems

Aerial bombs of France
Anti-runway weapons
Matra
Military equipment introduced in the 1970s